Vilas is an  unincorporated community in Wilson County, Kansas, United States.

History
Vilas had its start in the year 1886 by the building of the railroad through that territory.

Vilas had a post office from the 1880s until 1954.

References

Further reading

External links
 Wilson County maps: Current, Historic, KDOT

Unincorporated communities in Wilson County, Kansas
Unincorporated communities in Kansas